The Intertribal Friendship House (IFH) of Oakland is one of the oldest Native American-focused urban resource and community organizations in the United States. Founded in 1955, IFH was created by local residents, similarly to American Indian Center in Chicago. Beginning in 1952, the United States Bureau of Indian Affairs (BIA) supported a plan to relocate Native Americans to urban areas, further encouraged by the Indian Relocation Act of 1956. The IFH has offered educational activities, elder and youth programs, holiday meals, counseling for social services, space for community meetings, conferences, receptions, memorials, and family affairs.

Related Groups

Organizations and institutions, especially of the San Francisco Bay Area that at some point were or are currently related to or affiliated with IFH include:

 Native American Health Center
 American Indian Child Resource Center
 United Indian Nations
 Indigenous Nations Child and Family Agency
 San Francisco Indian Center
 Friendship House Association of American Indians
 California Indian Legal Services
 American Indian Film Institute
 American Indian AIDS Institute of San Francisco

See also
 American Indian Center
 International Indian Treaty Council
 American Indian Public Charter School

References

External links
 Intertribal Friendship House official website.
 Bureau of Indian Affairs under the United States Department of the Interior.

Buildings and structures in Oakland, California
Native American history of California
1955 establishments in California